The men's points race competition at the 2023 UEC European Track Championships was held on 9 February 2023.

Results
160 laps (40 km) were raced with 16 sprints.

References

Men's points race
European Track Championships – Men's points race